The Russian men's national ice hockey team is the national men's ice hockey team of Russia, overseen by the Ice Hockey Federation of Russia. As of 2021, they were rated third in the IIHF World Ranking. The team has competed internationally from 1992 until a 2022 ban, and is recognized by the IIHF as the successor to the Soviet Union team and CIS team. Russia has been one of the most successful national ice hockey teams in the world and a member of the so-called "Big Six," the unofficial group of the six strongest men's ice hockey nations, along with Canada, the Czech Republic, Finland, Sweden, and the United States. The European nations of the Big Six participate in the Euro Hockey Tour, which Russia won nine times since 2005. Since September 2021, the head coach is Alexei Zhamnov, who took over from Valeri Bragin.

Since the establishment of the team, Russia has participated in 29 IIHF World Championships tournaments and nine Olympic ice hockey tournaments, winning five world championships and one Olympic gold medal.

After the Russian invasion of Ukraine, the International Ice Hockey Federation suspended Russia from all levels of competition on February 28, 2022. In April 2022, the Federation banned Russia from participating in the 2023 IIHF World Championship.

History

Origins

The Allrussian Hockey League was founded by some clubs in the Russian Empire and entered the International Ice Hockey Federation (IIHF) in 1911. However, probably due to misunderstandings ("hockey" was identified with bandy or Russian hockey in Russia, not with the modern ice hockey rules developed in Canada) the Russian team left the organization. There were no matches involving a team from Imperial Russia.

Interest in this sport grew in the Soviet Union in the 2nd half of the 1940s. The first reactions were skeptical; one sports journal, Physical Culture and Sports, characterized it as such: "The game is quite individual and primitive, with few combinations, not as in bandy. Therefore, Canadian hockey should not be cultivated into our country..." However, Canadian hockey became more and more popular in the Soviet Union.

The first Soviet Championships League was introduced in 1946. The national team was formed shortly after, playing their first matches in a series of exhibitions against LTC Praha in 1948. In 1952, the Hockey Federation of the USSR joined the International Ice Hockey League, and so received the permission to play in the World Championships and the Olympics. That year is seen as the birth of the Soviet national ice hockey team, the predecessor team of the Russia men's national ice hockey team. The Soviets won the 1954 Ice Hockey World Championships, and two years later they won gold at the 1956 Winter Olympics.

From then until the demise of the Soviet Union in 1991, the "Red Machine" (Krasnaya Mashina) was one of the most dominant teams in international play, winning nearly every World Championship and Olympic tournament, as well as defeating many teams with professional players, such as in the 1974 Summit Series, the Super Series, and the 1981 Canada Cup. Until 1977, professional players were not able to participate in the World Championship, and it was not until 1988 that they could play in the Winter Olympics. The Soviet team was populated with amateur players who were hired by Soviet enterprises (aircraft industry, food workers, tractor industry) or organizations (KGB, Red Army, Soviet Air Force) that sponsored what would be presented as an after-hours social sports society hockey team for their workers but were set-up for the athletes to train full-time. This type of amateur player was contested by Canada and the United States whose best players were participating in professional leagues.

After the USSR's dissolution
The Soviet Union dissolved shortly before the 1992 Winter Olympics, so a Unified Team largely consisting of the former Soviet republics competed instead. The CIS national ice hockey team, composed almost entirely of Russians, with Lithuanian-born Darius Kasparaitis and Ukrainian-born Alexei Zhitnik the only non-Russians, competed as part of this Olympic delegation. The team finished second in its preliminary group, beating co-favorites Canada, 5–4, but losing to Czechoslovakia, 3–4. The CIS team then defeated the Finns and Americans, 6–1 and 5–2, respectively. In the final, they played Canada again, winning 3–1 and claimed the gold medal. The team was coached by the Russian and former Soviet coach Viktor Tikhonov. In later years, the IIHF recognized this gold medal as being won by the Russian national team, rather than by the CIS. However, the International Olympic Committee has not recognized Russia as the Olympic champions for this Winter Games.

Russia joined the IIHF as an independent state on 6 May 1992, along with 10 other states, including seven other former Soviet republics. Unlike the others, which applied as new member states and had to begin playing at the bottom tiers of the World Championship, Russia was allowed to replace the Soviet Union in its position and was thus entered into the elite division for the 1992 World Championship. Russia's first actual games after the Soviet dissolution were a series of five friendly games between Sweden, Germany and Switzerland, all taking place in April 1992, the debut game occurring on 12 April 1992 against Sweden and ending in a 2–2 draw. At the 1992 World Championship Russia finished first in its preliminary group but lost to Sweden in the quarterfinals, 2–0. They, however, won the next edition of the tournament, beating Germany, Canada, and Sweden in the playoffs and clinching their first title as Russia.

The post-Soviet drought
As the USSR fell apart, so did Russia's elite hockey program. At the 1994 Winter Olympics they finished fourth overall, losing the bronze medal match to Finland. Russia also competed at the 1996 World Cup, the successor tournament to the Canada Cup, where the team lost in the semi-finals to the eventual winner, the United States. At the 1998 Winter Olympics, Russia won five consecutive games and reached the gold medal match, where they lost to the Czech Republic, 0–1.

During the drought in 1994, Russian journalist Vsevolod Kukushkin reported that "The people are upset. Russia is a nation of critics." He said the Russian team was struggling with finances to support training, no funding was received from the national level, and professional teams in Russia were struggling to stay afloat. He also reported that the Russian people were upset at losing the nation's best players to the National Hockey League, and not playing on the Russian national team.

The Russian resurgence

The Bykov period
After failing to win the gold medal between 1993 and 2007, the Russians restructured the national league as the KHL and hired the 1993 World Champion, Vyacheslav Bykov, as the head coach. Another 1993 champion, Sergey Fedorov, was named the team captain. Afterwards, Russia won the 2008 and 2009 World Ice Hockey Championships with perfect records, beating Canada in the finals two times in a row. The Russians would make another run in 2010, losing to the Czech Republic in the gold medal game. However, the disastrous 2010 Olympics and 2011 World Championships led to Bykov's removal.

Bilyaletdinov at the helm
Bykov was replaced with Bilyaletdinov, under whose leadership Russia won the 2012 Men's World Ice Hockey Championships with yet another perfect record, beating Slovakia, 6–2, in the gold medal game. However, as a result of the 2013 Championship and 2014 Olympic performances, Bilyaletdinov was replaced with Oleg Znarok.

The Znarok years 
Znarok then led the Russians to the gold medal in the 2014 World Ice Hockey Championship after defeating Finland 5–2 in the final, with a perfect record. The 2014 tournament result set the most perfect records in the IIHF World Championships. For this accomplishment, the Russian team was honored in the Kremlin.

Russia earned a medal in each subsequent tournament, including the silver medal in 2015 and the bronze medals in 2016 and 2017. The team also reached the semi-finals of the World Cup, losing to Canada, the eventual winner.

In 2018, the Russian Olympic Committee was disqualified by the International Olympic Committee for doping, but the Russian players were cleared to participate by the IOC under the Olympic flag as the Olympic Athletes from Russia (OAR) using professional Russian hockey players with no previous drug violations and a consistent history of drug testing. Like the rest of the Olympic hockey teams in 2018, the Russian team could not use NHL players due to the league's prohibiting player participation in the Olympics. As a result, the team relied on players from the KHL (15 from a reigning champion, SKA Saint Petersburg, 8 from CSKA Moscow and 2 from Metallurg Magnitogorsk).

After a loss in their first game to Slovakia, the OAR team defeated Slovenia and the United States, qualifying for the quarterfinals. The team then defeated Norway and the Czech Republic to reach the finals. The team won the gold medal after a 4–3 overtime victory over the German team in the final. Kovalchuk and Pavel Datsyuk each won their first gold in their fifth Olympic appearance and together with Slava Voynov, were the only players with prior Olympic experience on the team. In its post-Olympics World Ranking, the IIHF considered the OAR team as the Russian team in its rankings. The IIHF considers this victory to be Russia's second gold medal in the Olympics, as they also attributed the 1992 Unified Team gold medal to Russia, however, the IOC does not attribute either of these results to Russia.

After the Olympics, Znarok became a consultant for the Russian National Team. He retired as Russia's most decorated modern head coach, with a World Championship, an Olympic gold medal, and a Euro Hockey Tour victory.

Vorobiev as head coach
Ilya Vorobiev was hired as the interim head coach of the Russian national hockey team in April 2018 for the 2018 IIHF World Championship and the second half of 2017–18 Euro Hockey Tour. In the remainder of Euro Hockey Tour, Vorobiev led the Russian team to a 1–5 record, following the 5–1 record of the Znarok-led team in the first half of 2017–18 Euro Hockey Tour, for the team to finish 6–6 on the season. At the 2018 World Championship, Russia finished second in its group and lost to Canada 4–5 in the quarterfinal, finishing sixth overall. 

Next season, Russia went 8–4 in the 2018–19 Euro Hockey Tour, winning the competition and went all the way to the semi-final at the 2019 World Championship, where it lost to Finland before beating the Czech Republic for the bronze. Following the World Championship, Vorobiev was dismissed and replaced with Alexei Kudashov.

Kudashov's realm
Kudashov went 3–6 at the 2019–20 Euro Hockey Tour before the 2020 IIHF World Championship was canceled due to the COVID-19 pandemic. Kudashov was sacked in June 2020 and replaced with Valeri Bragin, a coach of the Russia men's U20 team.

Bragin's team
Bragin proceeded to win the 2020–21 Euro Hockey Tour with a 10–2 record. At the 2021 IIHF World Championship, Russia went 6–1 in the group stage but then lost in the quarter-finals to Canada, which finished with a 3–4 record in the group stage but went on to win the tournament. Bragin was replaced by Alexei Zhamnov in September 2021.

Zhamnov's team
With Zhamnov the Russian national team participated at the 2022 Olympics in Beijing (under the Russian Olympic Committee flag and the moniker ROC), where they reached the second Olympic final in a row, losing to Finland 1–2 and winning silver medals.

After the Russian invasion of Ukraine, the International Ice Hockey Federation suspended Russia from all levels of competition. In April 2022, the Federation banned Russia from participating in the 2023 IIHF World Championship.

Despite the ban, the team participated in the 2023 Channel One Cup, alongside Kazakhstan and Belarus.

Tournament record

Olympic Games

World Championship

World Cup

Euro Hockey Tour
The Euro Hockey Tour (EHT) started in 1996 and is held every season between the quartet of European nations of the Big Six nations of ice hockey. The usual format is to have the teams play against each other four times, once in Finland, once in Russia, once in Sweden, and once in the Czech Republic. There are occasional deviations from the format if additional nations, such as Canada, are invited to compete. Russia has won the EHT nine times .

Euro Hockey Tour medal table

Tournament summary
Karjala Tournament:
 Gold medal (2006, 2007, 2008, 2009, 2011, 2016, 2018, 2020)
 Silver medal (1998, 1999, 2001, 2010, 2013, 2017)
 Bronze medal (1996, 1997, 2000, 2003, 2005, 2012, 2014, 2015, 2019, 2021)

Channel One Cup:
 Gold medal (1999, 2000, 2004, 2005, 2006, 2007, 2008, 2010, 2012, 2014, 2017, 2018, 2020)
 Silver medal (1996, 1997, 2001, 2009, 2016, 2019, 2021)
 Bronze medal (2002, 2003, 2011, 2013)

Sweden Hockey Games:
 Gold medal (2003, 2006, 2008, 2017, 2021)
 Silver medal (2007, 2009, 2011, 2019)
 Bronze medal (1997, 2004, 2005, 2010, 2012, 2013, 2018)

Czech Hockey Games:
 Gold medal (2002, 2006, 2007, 2009 (April))
 Silver medal (2001, 2005, 2009 (September), 2011, 2013 (April), 2013 (August))
 Bronze medal (1997, 2003, 2012, 2017, 2019)

Russia's Euro Hockey Tour (EHT) Cup medal table
As of February 2022

Other tournaments
Deutschland Cup:  Gold medal (1992, 1993, 2017, 2018)
Nissan Cup:  Silver medal (1992, 1994)
Northern Lights Tournament:  Bronze medal (1993)

Team

Current roster
Roster for the 2021 IIHF World Championship.

Head coach: Valeri Bragin

Coaching history
Olympics
 1994 – Viktor Tikhonov
 1998 – Vladimir Yurzinov (Pyotr Vorobyov, Zinetula Bilyaletdinov)
 2002 – Viacheslav Fetisov (Vladimir Yurzinov, Vladislav Tretiak)
 2006 – Vladimir Krikunov (Vladimir Yurzinov, Boris Mikhailov)
 2010 – Vyacheslav Bykov (Igor Zakharkin)
 2014 – Zinetula Bilyaletdinov (Valery Belov, Dmitry Yushkevich, Igor Nikitin, Valeri Belousov, Vladimir Myshkin)
 2018 – Oleg Znarok (Harijs Vītoliņš, Ilya Vorobiev, Rashit Davydov, Igor Nikitin, Alexei Zhamnov)
 2022 – Alexei Zhamnov (Sergei Fedorov, Alexei Kudashov, Sergei Gonchar)

World Championships
 1993 – Boris Mikhailov (Pyotr Vorobyov, Igor Tuzik, Gennady Tsygurov)
 1994 – Boris Mikhailov (Pyotr Vorobyov, Igor Tuzik, Gennady Tsygurov)
 1995 – Boris Mikhailov (Pyotr Vorobyov, Igor Tuzik, Gennady Tsygurov)
 1996 – Vladimir Vasiliev (Gennady Tsygurov, Viktor Tikhonov)
 1997 – Igor Dmitriev (Boris Mikhailov, Igor Tuzik)
 1998 – Vladimir Yurzinov (Pyotr Vorobyov, Zinetula Bilyaletdinov)
 1999 – Alexander Yakushev (Pyotr Vorobyov, Zinetula Bilyaletdinov)
 2000 – Alexander Yakushev (Pyotr Vorobyov, Zinetula Bilyaletdinov)
 2001 – Boris Mikhailov (Valeri Belousov, Vladimir Krikunov )
 2002 – Boris Mikhailov (Valeri Belousov, Vladimir Krikunov)
 2003 – Vladimir Plyushchev (Alexander Yakushev, Nikolai Tolstikov)
 2004 – Viktor Tikhonov
 2005 – Vladimir Krikunov (Vladimir Yurzinov, Boris Mikhailov)
 2006 – Vladimir Krikunov (Vladimir Yurzinov, Boris Mikhailov)
 2007 – Vyacheslav Bykov (Igor Zakharkin)
 2008 – Vyacheslav Bykov (Igor Zakharkin)
 2009 – Vyacheslav Bykov (Igor Zakharkin)
 2010 – Vyacheslav Bykov (Igor Zakharkin, Valeri Bragin, Andrei Nazarov)
 2011 – Vyacheslav Bykov (Igor Zakharkin)
 2012 – Zinetula Bilyaletdinov (Valery Belov, Dmitry Yushkevich, Igor Nikitin, Vladimir Myshkin)
 2013 – Zinetula Bilyaletdinov (Valery Belov, Dmitry Yushkevich, Igor Nikitin, Vladimir Myshkin)
 2014 – Oleg Znarok (Harijs Vītoliņš, Vladimir Fedosov, Igor Nikitin, Yuri Zhdanov, Rashit Davydov, Oleg Kupryanov)
 2015 – Oleg Znarok (Harijs Vītoliņš, Vladimir Fedosov, Igor Nikitin, Yuri Zhdanov, Rashit Davydov, Oleg Kupryanov)
 2016 – Oleg Znarok (Harijs Vītoliņš, Ilya Vorobiev, Rashit Davydov, Igor Nikitin)
 2017 – Oleg Znarok (Harijs Vītoliņš, Ilya Vorobiev, Rashit Davydov, Igor Nikitin)
 2018 – Ilya Vorobiev (Alexei Zhamnov, Anvar Gatiyatulin, Rashit Davydov, Igor Nikitin)
 2019 – Ilya Vorobiev (Alexei Zhamnov, Anvar Gatiyatulin, Rashit Davydov, Igor Nikitin)
 2021 – Valeri Bragin (Albert Leschov, Stefan Persson, Konstantin Shafranov, Alexander Titov)

World Cup
 1996 – Boris Mikhailov
 2004 – Zinetula Bilyaletdinov
 2016 – Oleg Znarok

Uniform evolution

See also
Soviet Union national ice hockey team
CIS national ice hockey team

Notes

References

External links

IIHF profile
National Teams of Ice Hockey

 
National ice hockey teams in Europe
Ice hockey teams in Russia